Pectenocypris is a genus of small fish in the family Cyprinidae endemic to freshwater habitats in Borneo and Sumatra in Indonesia.

Species
There are currently 4 recognized species in this genus:

 Pectenocypris balaena T. R. Roberts, 1989
 Pectenocypris korthausae Kottelat, 1982
 Pectenocypris micromysticetus H. H. Tan & Kottelat, 2009
 Pectenocypris nigra Wibowo, Ahnelt & Kertamihardja, 2016
 Pectenocypris rubra Ahnelt, Wibowo & Prianto, 2020

References

 
Fish of Asia
Fish of Indonesia